Alois Kreidl (born 25 March 1960) is an Austrian male curler.

At the national level, he is 19-time Austrian men's champion curler.

Teams

References

External links

Living people
1960 births
Austrian male curlers
Austrian curling champions
Place of birth missing (living people)